Xanthodaphne subrosea is a species of sea snail, a marine gastropod mollusk in the family Raphitomidae.

Description

Distribution
This marine species occurs off South Africa.

References

 Barnard, Keppel Harcourt. Deep sea Mollusca from west of Cape Point, South Africa. South African Museum, 1963.
 

Endemic fauna of South Africa
subrosea
Gastropods described in 1963